The 2013–14 New Orleans Privateers men's basketball team represented the University of New Orleans during the 2013–14 NCAA Division I men's basketball season. The Privateers were led by third year head coach Mark Slessinger and played their home games at Lakefront Arena. They were new members of the Southland Conference. They finished the season 11–15, 8–10 in Southland play to finish in ninth place. Due to APR penalties, they were ineligible for postseason play, including the Southland Conference tournament.

Roster

Schedule
Source

|-
!colspan=9 style="background:#003399; color:#C0C0C0;"| Regular season

References

New Orleans Privateers men's basketball seasons
New Orleans
2013 in sports in Louisiana
2014 in sports in Louisiana